Ross Yorke Johnson (born 2 January 1976) is an English former footballer who played mostly as a defender. He played in the Football League for Brighton & Hove Albion and Colchester United, and also played non-league football with Dagenham & Redbridge, Canvey Island, Worthing and Eastbourne Borough.

Career
Born in Brighton, Johnson started his senior career at Brighton & Hove Albion in 1994. His first two goals for the club came on 5 February 2009; a 55th-minute header from a corner followed by his second goal after 86 minutes, also from a corner, in a 2–2 draw away to Swansea City. Over six years at Brighton, he appeared 132 times in the league, scoring twice. 

In January 2000, Johnson joined Colchester United on a one-month loan, making six appearances during his month at the club. Following his loan spell at Colchester, he joined Colchester permanently on a free transfer, signing a two-and-a-half year contract with the club. He appeared 46 times for Colchester over this spell at the club, scoring once, before being released at the end of his contract in 2002.

Following his release, Johnson signed for Dagenham & Redbridge, though Johnson left Dagenham & Redbridge in September 2002 after 7 appearances, joining Isthmian League side Canvey Island.

In the summer of 2003, Johnson signed for fellow Isthmian League side Worthing, making his debut for the club in a 1–1 draw against Windsor & Eton in August 2003. He joined Conference South side Eastbourne Borough in the summer of 2004 before leaving later that year by mutual consent after just one game.

References

External links
 
 Ross Johnson at Colchester United Archive Database

1970 births
Living people
Footballers from Brighton
English footballers
Association football defenders
Brighton & Hove Albion F.C. players
Colchester United F.C. players
Dagenham & Redbridge F.C. players
Canvey Island F.C. players
Worthing F.C. players
English Football League players
National League (English football) players
Eastbourne Borough F.C. players